Tillyard may be

Aelfrida Tillyard, author and religious figure
Eustace Mandeville Wetenhall Tillyard, literary scholar
Robert John Tillyard (1881–1937), entomologist
Stella Tillyard, author

See also
 Tillyard's skipper (Anisynta tillyardi), a butterfly species
 Tillard
 Tiltyard